Underwater is a 2020 American science fiction action horror film directed by William Eubank. The film stars Kristen Stewart, Vincent Cassel, Jessica Henwick, John Gallagher Jr., Mamoudou Athie, and T.J. Miller.

Underwater follows a group of workers on a drilling facility at the bottom of the ocean who encounter hostile creatures after an earthquake destroys the facility. The film was released in the United States on January 10, 2020, by 20th Century Fox; it was the last film under the Fox name before the studio's rebranding as 20th Century Studios on January 17. It received mixed reviews from critics and grossed $41 million worldwide against a production budget of $50–80 million.

Plot
In 2050, the Kepler 822, a research and drilling facility operated by Tian Industries at the bottom of the Mariana Trench, is struck by a strong earthquake. As part of the facility is destroyed by the quake, mechanical engineer Norah Price and her colleagues, Rodrigo and Paul, make their way to the escape pod bay. However, the three discover that all of the escape pods have already been deployed, with Captain Lucien being the only person in the area when the three arrive. Together they reach a control base and find biologist Emily Haversham and engineer Liam Smith, who are unsuccessful in their attempts to make contact with the surface. Lucien suggests using pressurized suits to walk one mile across the ocean floor to Roebuck 641 in the hope of resurfacing from there. As they descend in a freight elevator, Rodrigo’s defective helmet implodes under the water pressure. The surviving crew see a distress beacon from one of the escape pods below, and Smith and Paul go to investigate. As they arrive at the location, they find a body in the rubble. A creature emerges from the corpse's back and attacks. Smith kills the creature and takes it inside. Haversham examines the creature and realizes that it belongs to a previously undiscovered species.

The five make their way to the sea floor, but as they are walking, Kepler explodes above and nearly buries them in debris. Smith is hit, but Price and Lucien save him. They manage to get through an access tunnel to an intermediate station, where they can charge and clean their suits. However, they find that Smith's oxygen scrubber is badly damaged from the debris. On their way through the access tunnel, Paul is attacked by an unknown creature, dragged underwater and killed. Before the team leaves the access tunnel, they find that Smith's damaged oxygen pod will cause him to suffocate from the explosion's toxic fumes. Unwilling to leave another crew member behind, Price, Lucien and Haversham agree to help Smith walk. The four set off across the ocean floor, but a humanoid creature appears and drags Smith into a cave. Lucien manages to get Smith out, but is himself pulled from the other three. Price is dragged along with Lucien, but Lucien sacrifices himself to spare Price from the increasing pressure differential.

Price ends up at the abandoned Shepard station alone and is able to change her damaged diving suit before continuing toward Roebuck. Walking along the ocean floor, she reunites with Haversham and Smith, and proceeds to help drag Smith. As they enter Roebuck, they encounter a nest of the humanoid creatures hanging from the ceiling and try to sneak by, but the sound of Haversham's oxygen alarm wakes the creatures. Price is partially swallowed by one of the creatures, but is able to kill it and free herself. The three manage to reach the escape pod bay, but Price discovers that only two of the pods are functional. Price and Haversham manage to get the ailing Smith into a pod, and Price persuades Haversham to take the last one. As this happens, a gigantic creature emerges and attacks the Roebuck while the smaller creatures follow the two escape pods. Price, accepting her impending death, initiates an overload of the Roebuck's nuclear core, resulting in a massive explosion that kills the creatures and allows the escape pods to reach the surface. Tian Industries refuses to be involved with investigations into the events and prepares to expand its drilling efforts.

Cast

 Kristen Stewart as Norah Price – the mechanical engineer of the Kepler 822
 Vincent Cassel as Captain Lucien – the Captain of Kepler 822, 
 Jessica Henwick as Emily Haversham – the biologist of Kepler 822
 John Gallagher Jr. as Liam Smith – the engineer of Kepler 822
 Mamoudou Athie as Rodrigo Nagenda – a colleague of Norah, and the first survivor Norah finds
 T.J. Miller as Paul Abel – a colleague of Norah, who survived the initial cave in

Production
On February 22, 2017, it was announced that Kristen Stewart would star in Underwater, a film to be directed by William Eubank from a screenplay by Brian Duffield and Adam Cozad. It was revealed that principal production would commence the next month. On March 7, 2017, T.J. Miller and Jessica Henwick joined the cast, and principal production was set to commence later that month in New Orleans.

On April 5, 2017, during principal production, Vincent Cassel and Mamoudou Athie joined the cast, and the next day, John Gallagher Jr. was also added. In May 2017, following the end of filming for the film, it was revealed that Gunner Wright was also part of the cast. After shooting the film, the director decided to design the alpha creature based on H. P. Lovecraft's mythos, as it features Cthulhu as the monster.

Marco Beltrami & Brandon Roberts composed the film score. Fox Music & Hollywood Records released the soundtrack.

Release
Underwater was released in the United States on January 10, 2020 and in UK cinemas on February 7, 2020.

Reception

Box office
Underwater grossed $17.3 million in the United States and Canada, and $23.7 million in other territories, for a worldwide total of $41 million.

In the United States and Canada, Underwater was released alongside Like a Boss and the expansions of Just Mercy and 1917, and was projected to gross around $8 million in its opening weekend. The film made $2.7 million on its first day, including $500,000 from Thursday night previews. It went on to debut to $7 million, finishing seventh at the box office. The film fell 48% in its second weekend to $3.6 million (and $4.8 million over the four-day Martin Luther King Jr. Day holiday), finishing eleventh.

Critical response
The site's critical consensus reads, "Underwaters strong cast and stylish direction aren't enough to distract from the strong sense of déjà vu provoked by this claustrophobic thriller's derivative story." On Metacritic, the film has a weighted average score of 48 out of 100 based on 37 critics, indicating "mixed or average reviews". Audiences polled by CinemaScore gave the film an average grade of "C" on an A+ to F scale, and PostTrak reported it received an average 2 out of 5 stars, with 35% of people saying they would definitely recommend it.

John DeFore of The Hollywood Reporter wrote: "This is a creature feature, whose gory jump-scares and icktastic critter design are the reason you're here. An ensemble led by Kristen Stewart brings credible camaraderie to the scenario without quite matching the vivid chemistry of Alien and its best descendants; with such a tightly packed survival tale ahead of them, though, few viewers will be calling out for more character development."

Owen Gleiberman of Variety wrote: "Underwater is a stupefying entertainment in which every claustrophobic space and apocalyptic crash of water registers as a slick visual trigger, yet it's all built on top of a dramatic void. It's boredom in Sensurround."

Accolades

References

External links 
 Official Site on Fox Movies
 
 Underwater VFX 2020 

2020 films
2020 science fiction action films
2020 science fiction horror films
American science fiction action films
American science fiction horror films
American monster movies
2020s English-language films
Films about survivors of seafaring accidents or incidents
Films directed by William Eubank
Films scored by Marco Beltrami
Films set in 2050
Films shot in New Orleans
Films with underwater settings
Sea adventure films
20th Century Fox films
Underwater action films
Underwater civilizations in fiction
Cthulhu Mythos films
Chernin Entertainment films
2020s American films